Edward M. Knox (February 12, 1842 – March 28, 1916) was a Union Army soldier in the American Civil War who received the U.S. military's highest decoration, the Medal of Honor.

Knox was born in Manhattan, New York, on February 12, 1842. He was awarded the Medal of Honor, for extraordinary heroism on July 2, 1863, while serving as a Second Lieutenant with the 15th New York Battery Light Artillery, at Gettysburg, Pennsylvania. His Medal of Honor was issued on October 18, 1892.

He died at the age of 74 on March 28, 1916, and was buried at Woodlawn Cemetery in the Bronx, New York.

Medal of Honor citation

See also
List of Medal of Honor recipients for the Battle of Gettysburg
List of American Civil War Medal of Honor recipients: G–L

References

External links

1842 births
1916 deaths
Burials at Woodlawn Cemetery (Bronx, New York)
People from Manhattan
People of New York (state) in the American Civil War
Union Army soldiers
United States Army Medal of Honor recipients
American Civil War recipients of the Medal of Honor